"4 Words (To Choke Upon)" is a song from Welsh heavy metal band Bullet for My Valentine. It was released on March 28, 2005, through Visible Noise Records, as the first single from their debut album The Poison.

Track listing

Personnel
 Matthew Tuck – lead vocals, rhythm and lead guitar
 Michael "Padge" Paget – lead guitar, backing vocals
 Michael "Moose" Thomas – drums, percussion 
 Jason "Jay" James – bass, backing vocals

Charts

References

External links
Official Music Video on YouTube

2005 debut singles
Bullet for My Valentine songs